The men's 200 metres at the 2019 World Athletics Championships was held at the Khalifa International Stadium in Doha from 29 September to 1 October 2019.

Summary
Out of the blocks in the final, Adam Gemili took a slight lead through the turn with Andre De Grasse then Noah Lyles giving up as much as a meter.  Coming off the turn, Lyles accelerated past Gemili.  Once Lyles hit his top end speed, there was no catching him.  Behind him, Álex Quiñónez was gaining on De Grasse and both were edging closer to Gemili.  20 metres out, both went by.  Lyles won by 2 metres, De Grasse held off Quiñónez for silver.

Lyles' victory capped an evening of 3 men's gold medals for USA also including Sam Kendricks in the pole vault and Donavan Brazier in the 800 metres.

Records
Before the competition records were as follows:

The following records were set at the competition:

Qualification standard
The standard to qualify automatically for entry was 20.40.

Schedule
The event schedule, in local time (UTC+3), was as follows:

Results

Heats
The first three in each heat (Q) and the next three fastest (q) qualified for the semifinals.

Wind:Heat 1: +0.5 m/s, Heat 2: +0.5 m/s, Heat 3: +0.8 m/s, Heat 4: +0.7 m/s, Heat 5: +1.0 m/s, Heat 6: +0.9 m/s, Heat 7: +0.2 m/s

Semi-finals

The first 2 in each heat (Q) and the next two fastest (q) qualified for the final.

Wind:Heat 1: -0.3 m/s, Heat 2: +0.1 m/s, Heat 3: -0.1 m/s

Final
The final was started on 1 October at 22:40.

Wind: +0.3 m/s

References

200
200 metres at the World Athletics Championships